Faulks may refer to:
 Ben Faulks (born 1979), English actor
 Edward Faulks, Baron Faulks (born 1950), English lawyer and politician
 Neville Faulks (1908–1985), English judge
 Peter Faulks (born 1988), Australian rules footballer
 Sebastian Faulks (born 1953), British novelist and journalist

See also
Faulk (disambiguation)